Villarrubia Club de Fútbol is a football team based in Villarrubia de los Ojos, Castile-La Mancha, Spain. The team plays in Segunda División B, Group 4. The club's home ground is Campo Nuevo Municipal.

History 
Jesús Santos Fiorito founded the club in 1959 and became its first president.  

In the 2018-19 season the club finished 2nd in Tercera División, Group 18 and promoted to Segunda División B.

Season to season 

1 season in Segunda División B
9 seasons in Tercera División

Current squad

References

External links 
Official website 
Futbolme.com team profile 
Club & stadium history 

Football clubs in Castilla–La Mancha
1959 establishments in Spain
Association football clubs established in 1959
Province of Ciudad Real